Andreas Håtveit (born July 9, 1986), is a Norwegian freestyle skier. He won a gold medal in Ski Slopestyle at the 2008 Winter X Games XII in Aspen, Colorado.

Andreas was born and raised in Sudndalen, a little village of just 42 people in the mountains of Norway. His parents (Greek Roots) owned and managed a hotel there, and his dad also was contributing in the local ski resort, Hallingskarvet Skisenter. Andreas starting skiing when he was 2 years old, and he started freestyle skiing when he was 17.

He is a member of the Christian sports organization Kristen Idrettskontakt (KRIK).

Competitions
3rd 2011       Winter X Games XV (slope style) Aspen, Colorado
2nd 2010       Winter X Games XIV (slope style) Aspen, Colorado
1st 2008       Winter X Games XII (slope style) Aspen, Colorado
4th 2008       Winter X Games XII (Super pipe) Aspen, Colorado
6th 2007 	WORLD SKIING INVITATIONAL WHISTLER, BC CAN 	 	
2nd 2007 	NIPPON FREESKI OPEN NIIGATA, JPN 	 	 	
3rd 2007 	THE SKI TOUR STOP #2 BRECKENRIDGE, CO 	 	
3rd 2007 	US OPEN	COOPER, CO 	 	
3rd 2006 	KING OF STYLE 	STOCKHOLM, SWE 	 	
1st 2006 	WORLD SKIING INVITATIONAL WHISTLER, BC CAN 	 	
4th 2006 	JON OLSSON INVITATIONAL ARE, SWE 	 	
3rd 2006 	VAIL, CO US OPEN 	 	
2nd 2005 	AIR WE GO OSLO, NOR 	 	
2nd 2005 	WORLD SKIING INVITATIONAL WHISTLER, BC, CAN 	 	
8th 2005 	GRAVITY GAMES COPPER MOUNTAIN, CO 		
4th 2005 	FiS WORLD HALFPIPE CHAMPIONSHIPS RUKA, FIN 	 	
1st 2005 	PAUL MITCHELL FREESKI TOUR BRECKENRIDGE, CO 	 	
3rd 2005 	PAUL MITCHELL FREESKI TOUR BRECKENRIDGE, CO

Films

Andreas has appeared in many ski films including: Reasons, Rastafaride 7, Yeah Dude, Rough Cut, Mind The Gap, Ski Porn, War, Strike, 4th Street, Independence, Second Attempt, Everyday Is A Saturday, and Revolver.

He has also appeared in numerous web edits, the most prominent being his performance in Team Norway's 2009 entry for the Jon Olsson Super Sessions (JOSS) alongside fellow Norwegian skier PK Hunder. He is known for his technicality and ability to perform a wide variety of tricks, spinning both natural and unnatural.

References

External links
 Poor Boyz Productions – Andreas Håtveit

1986 births
Living people
Norwegian male freestyle skiers
Norwegian Christians
X Games athletes
Freeskiers
Freestyle skiers at the 2014 Winter Olympics
Olympic freestyle skiers of Norway